The Pakistan Army ranks and insignia are the military insignia used by the Pakistan Army. Being a former Dominion, Pakistan shares a rank structure similar to that of the British Army.

Commissioned officer ranks
The rank insignia of commissioned officers.

Other ranks
Junior Commissioned Officers wear their rank insignias in their shoulders; Non-Commissioned Officers rank insignia are displayed on mid sleeves; while in the combat uniforms all persons wear rank insignias in their uniforms chests. From the rank 'Lance Naik' the non-commissioned officer status starts. The ranks of Company Quartermaster Havildar, Company Havildar Major, Battalion Quartermaster Havildar and Battalion Havildar Major are company/battalion appointments held by senior Havildars. The ranks Sowar, all Daffadars and Risaldars are used in the armoured corps.

See also
 Pakistan Army
 List of serving generals of the Pakistan Army

References

External links
 

Pakistan Army personnel